Sir Maurice FitzGerald, 14th Knight of Kerry (died 1729) fought for James II in the Williamite War in Ireland, but after the defeat he conformed to the established religion by joining the Church of Ireland. He became Deputy Lieutenant of Kerry.

Birth and origins 
Maurice was the eldest son of Sir John FitzGerald and his wife Honora O'Brien. His father was the 13th Knight of Kerry. His mother was the third daughter of Connor O'Brien, 2nd Viscount Clare. Both parents were Roman Catholic. He was one of four brothers.

Williamite War 
FitzGerald fought for James II in the Williamite War in Ireland (1688–1691) alongside his brothers John, Daniel of Ballyruddery, and Thomas of Ardglass.

Marriage and children 
On 30 June 1703 FitzGerald married Elizabeth, second daughter of David Crosbie (died 1717), of Ardfert Abbey, High Sheriff of County Kerry, by his wife Jane Hamilton, daughter of William Hamilton of Liscloony, County Offaly. His wife was a Protestant and the sister of Maurice Crosbie, 1st Baron Brandon.

 
Maurice and Elizabeth had three sons of whom:
 John (1706–1741), his immediate successor
 Robert (1717–1781), who succeeded as the 17th knight

—and nine daughters, known as the "Nine Geraldines", of whom:
 Jane, married George Herbert, Esquire of Currans
 Honora, married Richard Meredyth, Esquire of Dicksgrove (near Currans)
 Bridget married first Thomas Sandes and secondly Mr. Creagh
 Margaret, married John Hewson of Ennismore

Later life and death 
Their children were raised as Protestants. Their daughters married into the Herberts (twice), Merediths (twice), Sandes', Creaghs, Stacks, Hewsons, Collis', Rices and Days.

In 1708 FitzGerald conformed to the established religion. His marriage, conversion, and the subsequent marriages of his children further alienated the Knights of Kerry from the local Catholic populace. FitzGerald became Deputy Lieutenant of Kerry.

FitzGerald died at Ballinruddery Castle, near Listowel, on 9 December 1729.

Notes and references

Citations

Sources 
  – A to KYR (for FitzGerald, the Knight of Kerry)

Further reading 
 Public Record Office of Northern Ireland: The FitzGerald (Knights of Kerry) Papers (MIC/639 and T/3075)
 Personal Family history. Confirmation would be appreciated.

1729 deaths
Irish knights
Maurice
FitzGerald
Deputy Lieutenants of Kerry